The dusky elephant shrew or dusky sengi (Elephantulus fuscus) is a species of elephant shrew in the family Macroscelididae. It is found in Malawi, Mozambique, and Zambia. Its natural habitat is dry savanna.

References

Elephant shrews
Mammals described in 1852
Taxa named by Wilhelm Peters
Taxonomy articles created by Polbot